The following article presents a summary of the 2018 football season in Brazil, which was the 117th season of competitive football in the country.

Campeonato Brasileiro Série A

The 2018 Campeonato Brasileiro Série A started on April 14, 2018, and is scheduled to end on December 2, 2018.

América Mineiro
Atlético Mineiro
Atlético Paranaense
Bahia
Botafogo
Ceará
Chapecoense
Corinthians
Cruzeiro
Flamengo
Fluminense
Grêmio
Internacional
Palmeiras
Paraná
Santos
São Paulo
Sport
Vasco da Gama
Vitória

Palmeiras won the league.

Relegation
The four worst placed teams, Sport, América Mineiro, Vitória and Paraná, were relegated to the following year's second level.

Campeonato Brasileiro Série B

The 2018 Campeonato Brasileiro Série B started on April 13, 2018, and concluded on November 24, 2018.

Atlético Goianiense
Avaí
Boa Esporte
Brasil de Pelotas
Coritiba
CRB
Criciúma
CSA
Figueirense
Fortaleza
Goiás
Guarani
Juventude
Londrina
Oeste
Paysandu
Ponte Preta
Sampaio Corrêa
São Bento
Vila Nova

Fortaleza won the league.

Promotion
The four best placed teams, Fortaleza, CSA, Avaí and Goiás, were promoted to the following year's first level.

Relegation
The four worst placed teams, Paysandu, Sampaio Corrêa, Juventude and Boa Esporte, were relegated to the following year's third level.

Campeonato Brasileiro Série C

The 2018 Campeonato Brasileiro Série C started on April 14, 2018, and concluded on September 22, 2018.

ABC
Atlético Acreano
Botafogo (PB)
Botafogo (SP)
Bragantino
Confiança
Cuiabá
Globo
Joinville
Juazeirense
Luverdense
Náutico
Operário Ferroviário
Remo
Salgueiro
Santa Cruz
Tombense
Tupi
Volta Redonda
Ypiranga

The Campeonato Brasileiro Série C final was played between Operário Ferroviário and Cuiabá.

Operário Ferroviário won the league after beating Cuiabá

Promotion
The four best placed teams, Operário Ferroviário, Cuiabá, Botafogo (SP) and Bragantino, were promoted to the following year's second level.

Relegation
The four worst placed teams, Tupi, Juazeirense, Salgueiro and Joinville, were relegated to the following year's fourth level.

Campeonato Brasileiro Série D

The 2018 Campeonato Brasileiro Série D started on April 21, 2018, and concluded on August 4, 2018.

4 de Julho
Altos
América de Natal
Americano
Aparecidense
ASA
ASSU
Atlético Itapemirim
Barcelona
Baré
Belo Jardim
Brasiliense
Brusque
Caldense
Campinense
Caxias
Ceilândia
Central
Cianorte
Cordino
Corumbaense
Dom Bosco
Espírito Santo
Ferroviária
Ferroviário

Fluminense de Feira
Guarani de Juazeiro
Imperatriz
Independente

Interporto
Iporá
Itabaiana
Itumbiara
Jacuipense
Linense
Macaé
Macapá
Madureira
Manaus
Maringá
Mirassol
Mogi Mirim
Moto Club
Murici
Nacional
Nova Iguaçu
Novo Hamburgo
Novoperário
Novorizontino
Plácido de Castro
Prudentópolis
Real Ariquemes
Rio Branco (AC)
Santa Rita
Santos (AP)
São José (RS)
São Raimundo (PA)
São Raimundo (RR)
Sergipe
Sinop
Sparta
Treze
Tubarão
Uberlândia
URT
Vitória da Conquista

The Campeonato Brasileiro Série D final was played between Ferroviário and Treze.

Ferroviário won the league after defeating Treze.

Promotion
The four best placed teams, Ferroviário, Treze, São José (RS) and Imperatriz, were promoted to the following year's third level.

Domestic cups

Copa do Brasil

The 2018 Copa do Brasil started on January 30, 2018, and concluded on October 17, 2018. The Copa do Brasil final was played between Cruzeiro and Corinthians.

Cruzeiro won the cup after defeating Corinthians.

Copa do Nordeste

The competition featured 20 clubs from the Northeastern region. It started on August 15, 2017, and concluded on July 7, 2018. The Copa do Nordeste final was played between Sampaio Corrêa and Bahia.

Sampaio Corrêa won the cup after defeating Bahia.

Copa Verde

The competition featured 18 clubs from the North and Central-West regions, including the Espírito Santo champions. It started on January 21, 2018, and concluded on May 16, 2018. The Copa Verde final was played between Paysandu and Atlético Itapemirim.

Paysandu won the cup after defeating Atlético Itapemirim.

State championship champions

State cup competition champions

Youth competition champions

(1) The Copa Nacional do Espírito Santo Sub-17, between 2008 and 2012, was named Copa Brasil Sub-17. The similar named Copa do Brasil Sub-17 is organized by the Brazilian Football Confederation and it was first played in 2013.

Brazilian clubs in international competitions

Brazil national team
The following table lists all the games played by the Brazilian national team in official competitions and friendly matches during 2018.

Friendlies

2018 FIFA World Cup

Women's football

National team
The following table lists all the games played by the Brazil women's national football team in official competitions and friendly matches during 2018.

The Brazil women's national football team competed in the following competitions in 2018:

Friendlies

2018 Copa América

2018 Tournament of Nations

Campeonato Brasileiro de Futebol Feminino Série A1

The 2018 Campeonato Brasileiro de Futebol Feminino Série A1 started on April 25, 2018, and concluded on October 26, 2018.

Audax
Corinthians
Ferroviária
Flamengo/Marinha
Foz Cataratas
Iranduba
Kindermann
Pinheirense
Ponte Preta
Portuguesa (SP)
Rio Preto
Santos
São Francisco
São José
Sport
Vitória das Tabocas

The Campeonato Brasileiro de Futebol Feminino Série A1 final was played between Corinthians and Rio Preto.

Corinthians won the league after defeating Rio Preto.

Relegation
The two worst placed teams, Portuguesa (SP) and Pinheirense, were relegated to the following year's second level.

Campeonato Brasileiro de Futebol Feminino Série A2

The 2018 Campeonato Brasileiro de Futebol Feminino Série A2 started on March 24, 2018, and concluded on July 12, 2018.

3B da Amazônia
América Mineiro
Atlético Acreano
Botafogo (PB)
Canindé
Caucaia
Comercial (MS)
Duque de Caxias
Embu das Artes
ESMAC
Grêmio
Gurupi
Internacional
Jaó
Lusaca
Minas/ICESP
Napoli
Náutico
Porto (RO)
Sampaio Corrêa
Santana
São Gonçalo (CE)
São Raimundo (RR)
Tiradentes
Toledo/Ouro Verde
UDA
União (RN)
Vila Nova (ES)
Vitória

The Campeonato Brasileiro de Futebol Feminino Série A2 final was played between Minas/ICESP and Vitória.

Minas/ICESP won the league after defeating Vitória.

Promotion
The two best placed teams, Minas/ICESP and Vitória, were promoted to the following year's first level.

Domestic competition champions

Brazilian clubs in international competitions

References

 Brazilian competitions at RSSSF

 
Seasons in Brazilian football
2018 sport-related lists